The Church of St Mary and St Alkelda is a Church of England parish church in Middleham, Richmondshire, North Yorkshire. The church is a grade I listed building, and it dates from the 13th century.

History
The church was made a collegiate church in 1477 by Richard, Duke of Gloucester (later Richard III). Richard III's young son and heir, Edward of Middleham, Prince of Wales, may possibly have been buried in the church after his death nearby in Middleham Castle in 1484. The collegiate body of the church consisted of a dean, six chaplains, four clerks and six choristers. The church was a Royal Peculiar until 1856, at which point the Dean was replaced by a Rector.

On 15 February 1967, the church was designated a Grade I listed building.

Present day
Today, the church is part of the benefice of "Middleham w Coverdale and E Witton and Thornton St" in the Archdeaconry of Richmond and Craven of the Diocese of Leeds.

The parish stands in the Conservative Evangelical tradition of the Church of England. The benefice has not passed resolutions rejecting the ordination of women.

Notable clergy
 Harry Topham, clergyman and cricketer, served as rector from 1903 to 1925

References

External links
 Benefice website
 A Church Near You entry

Grade I listed churches in North Yorkshire
13th-century church buildings in England
Conservative evangelical Anglican churches in England
Former Royal Peculiars
Former collegiate churches in England
Middleham